Xizhimen station is an interchange station for Line 2, Line 4 and Line 13 of the Beijing Subway. Just outside this station is Beijing North railway station.
Line 2 opened on September 20, 1984; Line 13 opened on January 28, 2003; and Line 4 opened on September 28, 2009. With the addition of Line 13 and Line 4, Xizhi Men Station became the second 3-way transfer station (the first was Dongzhimen Station, being the intersection of Line 2, Line 13, and Airport Express). With a peak daily ridership of over 770,000 passengers, Xizhi Men Station is also one of the most crowded stations of the whole Beijing Subway system. It sees over 170,000 transfers per day between the 3 lines serving the station.

Transfer 
Lines 2 and 4 are very close together, offering short but potentially crowded transfers. The walk from Lines 2 and 4 to Line 13 is considerably further.

Station layout 
Lines 2 and 4  both have underground island platforms. Line 13 has elevated side platforms using the spanish solution.

Exits 
There are six exits, lettered A, B, C, D, E, and F. Exits C and F are accessible.

Gallery

References

External links
 

Railway stations in China opened in 1984
Beijing Subway stations in Xicheng District